The Marshall Tucker Band is the self-titled debut album by American rock band The Marshall Tucker Band. Released in April 1973, the album was recorded in 1973 in Macon, Georgia, at Capricorn Studios.

Artistry
The album's musical style incorporates elements of psychedelic, jam band, jazz, R&B, gospel and folk. Guitarist/songwriter Toy Caldwell drew heavily from bluegrass and country while writing songs for the band's debut.

The album's eclectic style has been categorized as country rock and Southern rock.

The lead single, "Can't You See", musically is a mixture of country rock and Southern rock. The lyrics of "Can't You See" are noted as being dark, reflecting heartache and "a man running as far away as he can to begin the process of healing himself".

Legacy

In a retrospective review, AllMusic gave the album 4 out of 5 stars. Rolling Stone named the album one of the "50 rock albums every country fan should own". Paste magazine described the album as a "Southern rock classic".

Track listing
All songs written by Toy Caldwell.

Personnel
The Marshall Tucker Band
Doug Gray - lead vocals, percussion
Toy Caldwell - lead guitar, steel guitar, lead vocals on "Can't You See," "Hillbilly Band," and "Ab's Song"
Tommy Caldwell - bass guitar, background vocals, drums on "See You Later, I’m Gone"
George McCorkle - rhythm guitar, acoustic guitar, percussion
Paul Riddle - drums
Jerry Eubanks - flute, alto saxophone, background vocals

Additional Musicians
Paul Hornsby - piano, Fender Rhodes electric piano, Hammond organ, Moog synthesizer

Production
Producer: Paul Hornsby
Recording engineers: Paul Hornsby, Buddy Thornton
Album design and illustration: James Flournoy Holmes
Photography: C. Hearon, J. Duckworth at Camera House

References

Marshall Tucker Band albums
Capricorn Records albums
1973 debut albums
Albums produced by Paul Hornsby
Albums with cover art by James Flournoy Holmes
Country rock albums by American artists
Progressive rock albums by American artists